Peter Boss (born 29 August 1975, in Narragansett, Rhode Island) is a former racing driver. Boss raced in the Euro Formula 3000, Barber Dodge Pro Series and European Le Mans Series among other racing series. Boss retired from professional racing after the 2005 season.

Career history
Partnering with John Village Automotive Boss entered the Formula Vauxhall Winter Series in Great Britain. The American competed three races in the series. Boss succeeded his racing debut in 1998 in the Skip Barber Formula Dodge Southern Race Series. At Moroso Motorsports Park Boss scored his first career wins. While Matt Plumb dominated the season Boss finished in the runner-up position. The 21-year-old returned to the series in 1999. Boss scored the same number of points as championshipleader Brian Rivera. But as Rivera had more podium finishes Rivera clinched the championship.

In 1998 Boss also started his first Barber Dodge Pro Series season. In his first season, he scored one top ten finish, at Road Atlanta. The driver from Rhode Island was one of two drivers to finish all the races, the other being Todd Snyder. The 1999 season was considerably more successful than his debut season. Boss finished consistently in the top ten. The American also finished on the podium twice, at Lime Rock Park and Mid-Ohio. This successful campaign landed him the eighth spot in the championship rankings. His 2000 season was cut short due to a lack of sponsorship. Therefore, Peter Boss missed the two final races of the season. As a result, Boss was only placed thirteenth in the championship. The 2001 season proved to be his last season in the Barber Dodge Pro Series. This was also only a partial season as he participated in eight out of twelve races. After consistent top ten finishes he was again classified thirteenth in the final standings.

For 2002 Peter Boss returned to Europe to continue his racing career with his old team John Village Automotive. In the Italian-based Euro Formula 3000 Boss competed in a Lola T99/50. The American had a tough debut season with a number of DNF's. His best finish was a seventh place at Jerez but as only the top six scored points, Boss did not score any points during the season. His 2003 season was more successful. Boss scored points on several occasions and even scored a podium finish. At Pergusa the American finished behind Nicky Pastorelli and race winner Augusto Farfus. Both he and his teammate, Joel Nelson, finished seventh in the series.

For 2004 Peter Boss joined P.K. Sport for a partial schedule in the American Le Mans Series. Together with his teammate, Hugh Plumb, Boss competed in five ALMS races. The team failed to achieve any notable results with their Porsche 911 GT3-RS.

Personal
Peter Boss holds a bachelor's degree in history of St. Lawrence University. Boss completed this study in 1997. Boss completed his Master of Business Administration at Babson College in 2010. As of 2010 Boss is employed by WhaleRock Point Partners, a wealth management firm.

Motorsports results

American Open-Wheel racing results
(key) (Races in bold indicate pole position, races in italics indicate fastest race lap)

Barber Dodge Pro Series

Complete Euro Formula 3000 results
(key) (Races in bold indicate pole position) (Races in italics indicate fastest lap)

Complete Porsche Supercup results
(key) (Races in bold indicate pole position) (Races in italics indicate fastest lap)

24 Hours of Daytona

References

People from Narragansett, Rhode Island
Racing drivers from Rhode Island
24 Hours of Daytona drivers
12 Hours of Sebring drivers
Barber Pro Series drivers
American Le Mans Series drivers
Rolex Sports Car Series drivers
European Le Mans Series drivers
Auto GP drivers
1975 births
Porsche Supercup drivers
Living people
St. Lawrence University alumni
Babson College alumni